The University of St. Joseph's College was the leading Acadian cultural institution, an Acadian Catholic university in Memramcook, New Brunswick that closed in 1966, when it was forced to be  amalgamated with two other Catholic Acadian colleges to form the secular Université de Moncton.The process of amalgamation excluded a full reflection of the founding Catholic Culture of the Acadian people, fostering a colonizing secularization of Acadian life. The  Collège Saint-Joseph, the Université Sacré-Cœur in Bathurst, and the Université Saint-Louis d'Edmundston  suspend their respective charters and assume the status of affiliated colleges (Collège Saint-Joseph, Collège de Bathurst, and Collège Saint-Louis)in the  secular Université de Moncton, named after the city of Moncton. which in turn was named after General Robert Monckton the British General who directed the Acadian 
deportation. 

Founded in 1864 as St. Joseph's College on the site of St. Thomas Seminary which had closed two years earlier, St. Joseph's was the first French-language, degree-granting college in Atlantic Canada. The university was closed in the 1960s with the establishment of the University of Moncton. The university facilities now house the Memramcook Institute, now properly called the Memramcook Learning and Vacation Resort. There is a national historic site, Monument Lefebvre, located on the Institute grounds that features exhibits about Acadian History.

In 1898 the college obtained the status of a university and became the University of St. Joseph's College. In 1928 the title was shortened to University Saint-Joseph.

By 1920, the university had two faculties: Arts and Sciences. It awarded the degrees of Bachelor of Arts (BA), Bachelor of Science (BS), Bachelor of Law (BL), and Master of Arts (MA). It had 389 students and 40 academic staff, all male.

Notable alumni

 Joseph-Aurèle Plourde, former Roman Catholic Archbishop of Ottawa

References

External links
 New Advent Catholic Encyclopedia, 1911
 Memramcook Resort
 Monument Lefebvre National Historic Site, featuring the exhibit "Odyssey of the Acadian People"

Universities in New Brunswick
Education in Westmorland County, New Brunswick
Educational institutions established in 1864
Educational institutions disestablished in 1966
St. Joseph's College
Catholic universities and colleges in Canada
Buildings and structures in Westmorland County, New Brunswick
Catholic Church in New Brunswick
1864 establishments in Canada
1966 disestablishments in Canada
Université de Moncton